Hari Chand (1 April 1953 – 13 June 2022) was an Indian long-distance runner. In the 1976 Summer Olympics in Montreal, he came eighth in the 10,000 metre run with a time of 28:48.72, this however was a national record for an Indian athlete and was only beaten 32 years later by Surendra Singh.  In the 1980 Summer Olympics in Moscow he came 10th in the 10,000 meter run.  He also came 22nd in the 1980 Olympic Men's Marathon.  He ran barefoot in Montreal.

Hari Chand and his contemporary Shivnath Singh were rivals, the rivalry had begun in national events in India, Chand went on to beat Singh in several races of the Asian Championships in 1973 and 1975. He was awarded  the Arjuna award for athletics in 1975.

International competitions

References

External links
 

1953 births
2022 deaths
Indian male long-distance runners
Indian male marathon runners
Olympic athletes of India
Athletes (track and field) at the 1976 Summer Olympics
Athletes (track and field) at the 1980 Summer Olympics
Recipients of the Arjuna Award
Asian Games gold medalists for India
Asian Games medalists in athletics (track and field)
Athletes (track and field) at the 1978 Asian Games
Place of birth missing
Medalists at the 1978 Asian Games